Huron Township may refer to:

 Huron Township, Des Moines County, Iowa
 Huron Township, now Clinton Township, Macomb County, Michigan
 Huron Township, Michigan, in Huron County
 Huron Charter Township, Michigan, in Wayne County
 Huron Township, Cavalier County, North Dakota, in Cavalier County, North Dakota
 Huron Township, Erie County, Ohio
 Huron Township, Pennington County, South Dakota, in Pennington County, South Dakota

Township name disambiguation pages